Il cosmo sul comò is a 2008 sketch comedy film directed by Marcello Cesena and starring Aldo, Giovanni & Giacomo.

Cast
Aldo Baglio as Puk / various
Giovanni Storti as Tsu-Nam / various
Giacomo Poretti as Pin / various
Sara D'Amario as Giacomo's wife (Temperatura basale)
Silvana Fallisi as Rita, Aldo's wife (Milano Beach) / Marie Antoinette (Falsi prigionieri)
Sergio Bustric as Napoleon Bonaparte (Falsi prigionieri)
Victoria Cabello as Lady with an Ermine (Falsi prigionieri)
Raul Cremona as the dentist (Temperatura basale)
Luciana Turina as Irma, Aldo's mother in law (Milano Beach)
Angela Finocchiaro as Dr. Alexandra Gastani Frinzi (Temperatura basale)
Elena Giusti as Dr. Giuliana Magnaghi Ciurli (Temperatura basale)
Cinzia Massironi as Giacomo's wife (Milano Beach)
Isabella Ragonese as the animal shop's clerk (L'autobus del peccato)
Debora Villa as Giovanni's wife (Milano Beach)
Marcello Cesena as Jean Claude (Falsi prigionieri)
Lucianna De Falco as the gypsy (Temperatura basale)

References

External links
 

2008 comedy films
2008 films
Italian comedy films
2000s Italian-language films